Alli Hagar Olsson (16 September 1893 – 21 February 1978) was a Swedish-speaking Finnish writer, literary critic, playwright and translator.

Olsson was born in Kustavi. In 1922 she edited an avant-garde literary magazine, Ultra. She also contributed to another avant-garde magazine Quosego. 

In 1965 she received the Eino Leino Prize. She died, aged 84, in Helsinki.

References

Further reading

 

 Doctoral thesis about utopian thinking in Hagar Olsson's Works, 2011. (German with English and Swedish summary)
 Hagar Olsson: The woodcarver and death (Träsnidaren och döden, 1940) University of Wisconsin.

1893 births
1978 deaths
People from Kustavi
People from Turku and Pori Province (Grand Duchy of Finland)
Finnish writers in Swedish
Finnish women novelists
Writers from Southwest Finland
Recipients of the Eino Leino Prize
Finnish literary critics
Finnish women literary critics
20th-century Finnish novelists
20th-century Finnish women writers
Finnish dramatists and playwrights
Finnish women dramatists and playwrights